Hauts-de-France (also Upper France) is the northernmost region of France, created by the territorial reform of French regions in 2014, from a merger of Nord-Pas-de-Calais and Picardy. Its prefecture is Lille. The new region came into existence on 1 January 2016, after regional elections in December 2015. The Conseil d'État approved Hauts-de-France as the name of the region on 28 September 2016, effective the following 30 September.

With 6,009,976 inhabitants as of 1 January 2015 and a population density of 189 inhabitants per km2, it is the third most populous region in France and the second-most densely populated in metropolitan France after its southern neighbour Île-de-France. It is bordered by Belgium to the north.

Toponymy 
The region's interim name Nord-Pas-de-Calais-Picardie was a hyphenated placename, created by hyphenating the merged regions' names—Nord-Pas-de-Calais and Picardie—in alphabetical order.

On 14 March 2016, well ahead of the 1 July deadline, the regional council decided on Hauts-de-France as the region's permanent name. The provisional name of the region was retired on 30 September 2016, when the new name of the region, Hauts-de-France, took effect.

Geography 
It borders Belgium (Flanders and Wallonia) to the northeast, the North Sea to the north, the English Channel to the west, as well as the French regions of Grand Est to the east-southeast, Île-de-France to the south, and Normandy to the west-southwest. It is connected to the United Kingdom (England) via the Channel Tunnel.

Departments 
Hauts-de-France comprises five departments: Aisne, Nord, Oise, Pas-de-Calais, and Somme.

Major communities 
 Lille (227,560; region prefecture; surrounding area is home to over 1.5 million inhabitants)
 Amiens (133,448)
 Roubaix (94,713)
 Tourcoing (91,923)
 Dunkirk (90,995)
 Calais (72,589)
 Villeneuve-d'Ascq (62,308)
 Saint-Quentin (55,978)
 Beauvais (54,289)
 Valenciennes (42,691)

Economy 
The gross domestic product (GDP) of the region was 161.7 billion euros in 2018, accounting for 6.9% of French economic output. GDP per capita adjusted for purchasing power was 24,200 euros or 80% of the EU27 average in the same year. The GDP per employee was 101% of the EU average.

Linen weaving 
The region was a pivotal centre of mulquinerie.

See also 
 Battle of Vimy Ridge
 Canadian National Vimy Memorial
 Nord-Pas-de-Calais
 Picardy
 Regional Council of the Hauts-de-France
 Regions of France

References

External links 

  
 Merger of the regions – France 3 

 
France geography articles needing translation from French Wikipedia
Regions of France
2016 establishments in France
States and territories established in 2016